Socialist Workers Front (Marxist–Leninist) was a communist party in Panama. FOS(ml) was founded in 1973, following a split in the People's Party of Panama. FOS(ml) originated in the pro-Chinese 'Proletarian Wing' of PPP. FOS(ml) made its first public appearance on May Day 1973.

FOS(ml) was mainly active in the students movement. It also organized the Asociación de Amistad con la República Popular China. FOS(ml) published Bandera Roja (Red Flag) 1974–1980.

The general secretary of FOS(ml) was Enrique Castillero.

In 1980, FOS(ml) was dissolved following internal strife. One section would live on as the Communist Party (Marxist-Leninist) of Panama.

1973 establishments in Panama
1980 disestablishments in Panama
Communist parties in Panama
Anti-revisionist organizations
Stalinist parties
Maoist parties
Defunct political parties in Panama
Political parties disestablished in 1980
Political parties established in 1973
Maoism in North America